The Aguapeí River is a river of Mato Grosso state in western Brazil.
It is a tributary of the Jauru River, which in turn is a tributary of the Paraguay River.

Course

The Aguapeí River rises in the  Serra de Santa Bárbara State Park, then runs in a roughly northeast direction until it meets the Jauru.

See also
List of rivers of Mato Grosso

References

Sources

Rivers of Mato Grosso